Nicola Berti  (born 14 April 1967) is an Italian former footballer, who played as a midfielder. Berti's career spanned three decades, during which he played for several clubs: after beginning his career with Parma, he played with Fiorentina, and in particular Inter Milan, where he became an important figure in the club's midfield, winning a Serie A title and three UEFA Cups. After his time in Italy, he ended his career with spells in England, Spain and Australia, at Tottenham, Alavés, and Northern Spirit respectively.

A dynamic, tenacious and hard-working player, he was also regarded as a linchpin for the Italy national football team during the late 1980s and the early 1990s, notably reaching the final of the 1994 FIFA World Cup with Italy, and finishing in third place in the 1990 edition on home soil.

Club career 
Born in Salsomaggiore Terme, Berti started his career as a seventeen-year-old with Parma. In his debut season the club won the 1983–84 Serie C1 championship under manager Arrigo Sacchi, and gained promotion to Serie B. After three seasons at Fiorentina he was signed by Inter Milan in 1988 for £3.6 million.

In his first season at the club, Berti formed a notable midfield partnership with Lothar Matthäus, and was part of a team which won the 1988–89 record breaking Scudetto by an 11-point margin under manager Giovanni Trapattoni, losing only twice, and setting a Serie A points record. Berti himself contributed seven league goals in Serie A that season from midfield.

While at Inter, Berti also won the 1989 Supercoppa Italiana, and the UEFA Cup three times, also reaching an additional final in 1997; he played a key role in the club's victories from midfield during this period, and scored in both the 1991 UEFA Cup Final and the 1994 UEFA Cup Final.

In January 1998, Berti joined Tottenham Hotspur on a free transfer. With Spurs in danger of relegation upon his arrival midway through the 1997–98 season, Berti helped the club to a 13th-placed finish in the Premier League. After George Graham replaced Christian Gross as manager of Tottenham, Berti was allowed to leave the club and join Deportivo Alavés on a free transfer. 

He later had a season in Australia, with Northern Spirit.

International career 
After playing for Italy's under 21 team at both the 1986 and 1988 UEFA European Under-21 Football Championships under manager Cesare Maldini (reaching the final in 1986), Berti made his debut for the Italy senior team against Norway in 1988, under Azeglio Vicini. He scored his first goal, against Scotland on his third appearance for the Azzurri.

He was included in the squad for the 1990 FIFA World Cup, where he appeared in four matches, wearing the number 10 shirt, including the third place playoff versus England which Italy won 2–1; in the final minutes of the match, he scored from a Roberto Baggio cross, but the goal was incorrectly ruled offside - though Baggio's opener was offside and the winning penalty was dubious. At the 1994 World Cup under Arrigo Sacchi, Berti was more established and played in every match on the way to and including the final defeat against Brazil; he notably started the play which led to Roberto Baggio's last-minute match winning goal in the quarter-finals, against Spain, with a trademark long pass, after winning back possession. In total, he represented Italy on 39 occasions between 1988 and 1995, scoring three goals.

International goals 
Scores and results list Italy's goal tally first, score column indicates score after each Berti goal.

Style of play 
Berti was usually deployed in a central or holding midfield role. Despite his initial lack of notable elegance or technical ability, he was able to improve his ball skills significantly as his career progressed, showing great finesse and technical developments with time, and became known for his ability to run forward with the ball at speed from midfield due to his pace and athleticism, which made him difficult to contain during counter–attacks. He was an energetic, tenacious, and hard tackling box-to-box midfielder, who had a knack for committing fouls and picking up cards due to his aggressive challenges; although he was initially considered to be undisciplined from a tactical standpoint, as unlike most defensive midfielders, he preferred to put pressure on his opponents in more advanced midfield roles and press them further up the pitch rather than mainly sitting in front of his team's defence, he later demonstrated significantly improved tactical intelligence as he matured. A tall, slender, and dynamic footballer, he was known in particular for his pace, stamina, work-rate, vision, and passing range, which made him a versatile player, who was capable of playing anywhere in midfield; these skills allowed him to aid his team both defensively and offensively, or start attacking plays with long balls after obtaining possession. In addition to his ability to break down opposing plays, Berti was also effective in the air, which, along with his attacking drive, movement, and positional sense, as well as his powerful and accurate striking ability from distance, enabled him to run forward – either on or off the ball – after winning back possession, and contribute to his team's offensive play with additional goals from midfield. Although he was initially noted for his physical resemblance to playmaker Gianni Rivera in his youth, Berti's attributes and direct playing style later led him to be compared instead to his childhood idol, Marco Tardelli. During the 1994 World Cup final against Brazil, he was also used out of position as both a left and right–sided winger in a 4–4–2 formation by manager Arrigo Sacchi. Despite his ability, however, he was also known to be injury prone, which somewhat negatively effected the quality of his performances in his later career.

Honours 
Parma
 Serie C: 1983–84

Inter Milan
 Serie A: 1988–89; runner-up 1992–93
 Supercoppa Italiana: 1989
 UEFA Cup: 1990–91, 1993–94; runner-up 1996–97

Tottenham Hotspur
 Football League Cup: 1998–99

Italy
 FIFA World Cup: runner-up 1994; third place 1990

Individual
Pirata d'Oro (Inter Milan Player of the Year): 1994

Orders
 5th Class / Knight: Cavaliere Ordine al Merito della Repubblica Italiana: 1991

References

External links 
 
 Nicola Berti at Aussie Footballers
 1990 FIFA World Cup 3rd place play-off
 1994 FIFA World Cup Final
 
 Record of Caps

1967 births
Living people
People from Salsomaggiore Terme
Italian footballers
Association football midfielders
Italy international footballers
Italy under-21 international footballers
1990 FIFA World Cup players
1994 FIFA World Cup players
Parma Calcio 1913 players
ACF Fiorentina players
Inter Milan players
Tottenham Hotspur F.C. players
La Liga players
Serie A players
Serie B players
Serie C players
Premier League players
National Soccer League (Australia) players
Deportivo Alavés players
Northern Spirit FC players
Italian expatriate footballers
Expatriate soccer players in Australia
Expatriate footballers in Spain
Expatriate footballers in England
Italian expatriate sportspeople in Australia
Italian expatriate sportspeople in Spain
Italian expatriate sportspeople in England
UEFA Cup winning players
Knights of the Order of Merit of the Italian Republic
Footballers from Emilia-Romagna
Sportspeople from the Province of Parma